The Mayor of Seattle is the head of the executive branch of the city government of Seattle, Washington. The mayor is authorized by the city charter to enforce laws enacted by the Seattle City Council, as well as direct subordinate officers in city departments. (The Seattle City Council, the legislative branch of city government, is led by the council president.)

The mayor serves a four-year term, without term limits, and is chosen in citywide, two-round elections between nonpartisan candidates.

Since the appointment of Henry A. Atkins in 1869, 56 individuals have held the office of mayor. The city elected Bertha Knight Landes, the first female mayor of a major U.S. city, in 1926. Several mayors have served non-consecutive terms, while others have resigned or faced recall elections. Charles Royer holds the record for longest mayoral tenure in the city's history, serving three full terms from 1978 to 1990.

Bruce Harrell took office as mayor on January 1, 2022, becoming the first Asian-American and second African-American mayor in Seattle's History.

History

Seattle was initially incorporated as a town on January 14, 1865, by the Washington Territorial Legislature, governed by a board of trustees. Charles C. Terry served as president of the board of trustees, which remained unchanged until the town's disincorporation on January 28, 1867. The town of Seattle was incorporated a second time on December 2, 1869, with a new city charter that established the position of mayor. Henry A. Atkins was appointed as the first mayor of Seattle by the Territorial Legislature, and was elected to the office on July 11, 1870.

A new city charter, the Freeholders Charter, was adopted in 1890 and extended the mayor's term in office from one year to two years, but barred consecutive terms. The charter also moved elections to the first Monday in March and required the mayor to be at least 30 years of age and live within the city for two years.

A new city charter that was approved by the city's voters in 1946 lengthened the term of office for mayors from two years to four years, starting with the 1948 elections. In 1969 the age and residence requirements were removed from the charter.

Duties and powers

The mayor is the head of the executive branch of Seattle's municipal government, charged with the appointment and management of 25 department and commission heads that work directly for the mayor. In the event of an absence of the mayor, the president of the Seattle City Council assumes the duties of the position as mayor pro tem until their return, but a notification is not necessary under the city charter.

Elections and succession

The mayor is elected in a citywide election held every four years, composed of two stages: a primary election in August and a general election between the top two candidates in November. Elections are officially non-partisan.

If the office of mayor becomes vacant, the president of the city council becomes mayor for a five-day period to immediately fill the position. If the president of the city council declines to remain mayor, the city council is authorized to vote to appoint a councilmember to the role of mayor. The councilmember appointed to the position under both scenarios will forfeit their position on the city council until the next election. A mayor-elect can also take office earlier than the official inauguration date (January 1), upon certification of the election results and a decision by the city council to replace the appointed mayor.

A two-thirds majority vote of the city council can remove the mayor from office for a willful violation of duty or an offense involving moral turpitude.

List of mayors

References

External links

 Mayors of the City of Seattle, Seattle City Archives
 Timeline of Seattle's mayors, 1869–2013 from The Seattle Times

Seattle
History of Seattle